Michael Alex Robert Cohen (born 4 August 1998) is a South African-born French cricketer who plays for Derbyshire.

Early life
Michael was born on 4 August 1998 in Cape Town, South Africa. He is of French descent and holds a French passport.

Career
He made his first-class debut for Western Province in the 2016–17 Sunfoil 3-Day Cup on 2 March 2017. He made his Twenty20 debut for Western Province in the 2017 Africa T20 Cup on 25 August 2017. He made his List A debut for Western Province in the 2017–18 CSA Provincial One-Day Challenge on 21 January 2018.

He was the leading wicket-taker in the 2017–18 Sunfoil 3-Day Cup for Western Province, with 26 dismissals in six matches. In September 2018, he was named in Western Province's squad for the 2018 Africa T20 Cup.

In October 2019, he was signed by Derbyshire County Cricket Club in England on a two-year deal. Cohen is not considered as an overseas player, as he qualifies for EU citizenship.

References

External links
 

1998 births
Living people
South African cricketers
South African people of French descent
South African emigrants to France
Cape Cobras cricketers
Western Province cricketers
Cricketers from Cape Town
Derbyshire cricketers